Paul Salmon (6 March 1981) is a former professional rugby league footballer who played in the 1990s and 2000s.

International honours
Salmon won a cap for Ireland while at Barrow Raiders 1999 1-cap (sub). Salmon played for England schoolboys against France in 1997 whilst representing Barrow schoolboys ( 1 cap ), Salmon earned 4 caps for Great Britain and Ireland Young Lions in 1999 2 vs France and 2 vs Australian Schoolboys, Salmon toured South Africa with England under 21s in 2001 earning 1 cap vs South Africa

Playing career
Paul Salmon was named in John Kear's England 'A' squad during August 2002.
Salmon scored a national cup record 5 tries in one match VS Workington in 2002

References

External links
Salmon leaps to Vikings
(archived by archive.is) PROMISING winger Paul Salmon leaps back into Barrow's plans…
No Statistics at rugby.widnes.tv

1981 births
Barrow Raiders players
Ireland national rugby league team players
Living people
Place of birth missing (living people)
Rugby league fullbacks
Rugby league wingers
Widnes Vikings players